Kilburn may refer to:

Places
 Kilburn, London, England
 Kilburn (Brent ward), a ward in the London Borough of Brent, England
 Kilburn (Camden ward), a ward in the London Borough of Camden, England
 Kilburn Priory 
 Kilburn, Derbyshire, England
 Kilburn, North Yorkshire, England
 Kilburn, South Australia, Australia 
 Kilburn Dam in KwaZulu-Natal, South Africa

People 
 Kilburn (surname), including a list of people with the name
 Kilburn Wilmot (1911–1996), English cricketer

See also 
 Kilburn and the High Roads, a pub rock act formed in 1971 by Ian Dury
 Kilburn station (disambiguation)
 Kilbourn (disambiguation)